Dunster is a small farming community in the Robson Valley region of British Columbia, Canada. It is located 31 km east of McBride and 37 km west of Tête Jaune Cache, and 10 km north of Croydon. Dunster is home to one of the few remaining, original and least altered Grand Trunk Pacific Railway stations.

History
Dunster was named after Dunster, England. Railroad manager, H.P. Hinton chose the name from a list provided to him by Josiah Wedgwood. The station was constructed in 1913.  The Dunster Post Office was opened 1 December 1915 with George Hall as the first postmaster.  In 1921 Mrs A. McDonald became postmaster.

Climate

See also
 Dunster Fine Arts School
 Dunster CN railway station

External links
 Vanishing British Columbia: Grand Trunk Pacific Railway Stations
 Dunster Community webpage
 Map from British Columbia Travel and Discovery
 Robson Valley Music Festival
BCGNIS Geographical Name Query

References

Robson Valley
Regional District of Fraser-Fort George
Populated places on the Fraser River
Unincorporated settlements in British Columbia
Populated places in the Regional District of Fraser-Fort George
Canadian National Railway stations in British Columbia